Alberoni as a surname is an  uncommon family name. It has been found in fewer than 200 families most with heritage in the province of Piacenza (Italy).

Francesco Alberoni (born 1929), Italian sociologist and journalist
Francisco Alberoni 
Giovanni Battista Alberoni ( 1703-  1784), Italian painter, scenic designer, and engraver of the late-Baroque period
Giulio Alberoni (1664-1752), Italian cardinal and statesman
Paolo G. Alberoni, (born 1963), Italian financier and businessman author of the "Shareholder Ownership Value"
Sherry Alberoni (born 1946), American actress and voice artist

See also 

 Alberoni (disambiguation)

Italian-language surnames